Masson is a provincial electoral district in Quebec, Canada, that elects members to the National Assembly. It includes portions of the city of Mascouche and the La Plaine sector of the city of Terrebonne.

It was created for the 1989 election from parts of the Terrebonne and L'Assomption electoral districts.

In the change from the 2001 to the 2011 electoral map, it lost Charlemagne and the part of Repentigny it formerly had to the L'Assomption electoral district.

In the change from the 2011 to the 2017 electoral map, the riding will lose the La Plaine district of Terrebonne to the new riding of Les Plaines and will gain the part of the Lacheneaie District of Terrebonne east of Montée Dumais from the riding of L'Assomption.

Members of the National Assembly

Election results

^ Change is from redistributed results. CAQ change is from ADQ.

References

External links
Information
 Elections Quebec

Election results
 Election results (National Assembly)
 Election results (QuébecPolitique)

Maps
 2011 map (PDF)
 2001 map (Flash)
2001–2011 changes (Flash)
1992–2001 changes (Flash)
 Electoral map of Lanaudière region
 Quebec electoral map, 2011

Masson
Mascouche
Terrebonne, Quebec